Anacampsis malella is a moth of the family Gelechiidae. It is found in Greece and Iraq.

References

Moths described in 1959
Anacampsis
Moths of Europe
Moths of Asia